Cities and towns under the oblast's jurisdiction:
Yaroslavl (Ярославль) (administrative center)
city districts:
Dzerzhinsky (Дзержинский)
Frunzensky (Фрунзенский)
Kirovsky (Кировский)
Krasnoperekopsky (Красноперекопский)
Leninsky (Ленинский)
Zavolzhsky (Заволжский)
Pereslavl-Zalessky (Переславль-Залесский)
Rostov (Ростов)
Rybinsk (Рыбинск)
Tutayev (Тутаев)
Uglich (Углич)
Districts:
Bolsheselsky
with 7 rural okrugs under the district's jurisdiction.
Borisoglebsky
Urban-type settlements under the district's jurisdiction:
Borisoglebsky (Борисоглебский)
with 12 rural okrugs under the district's jurisdiction.
Breytovsky
with 8 rural okrugs under the district's jurisdiction.
Danilovsky
Towns under the district's jurisdiction:
Danilov (Данилов)
with 19 rural okrugs under the district's jurisdiction.
Gavrilov-Yamsky
Towns under the district's jurisdiction:
Gavrilov-Yam (Гаврилов-Ям)
with 9 rural okrugs under the district's jurisdiction.
Lyubimsky
Towns under the district's jurisdiction:
Lyubim (Любим)
with 8 rural okrugs under the district's jurisdiction.
Myshkinsky
Towns under the district's jurisdiction:
Myshkin (Мышкин)
with 10 rural okrugs under the district's jurisdiction.
Nekouzsky
with 11 rural okrugs under the district's jurisdiction.
Nekrasovsky
Urban-type settlements under the district's jurisdiction:
Burmakino (Бурмакино)
Krasny Profintern (Красный Профинтерн)
Nekrasovskoye (Некрасовское)
with 14 rural okrugs under the district's jurisdiction.
Pereslavsky
with 21 rural okrugs under the district's jurisdiction.
Pervomaysky
Urban-type settlements under the district's jurisdiction:
Prechistoye (Пречистое)
with 10 rural okrugs under the district's jurisdiction.
Poshekhonsky
Towns under the district's jurisdiction:
Poshekhonye (Пошехонье)
with 18 rural okrugs under the district's jurisdiction.
Rostovsky
Urban-type settlements under the district's jurisdiction:
Ishnya (Ишня)
Petrovskoye (Петровское)
Porechye-Rybnoye (Поречье-Рыбное)
Semibratovo (Семибратово)
with 15 rural okrugs under the district's jurisdiction.
Rybinsky
Urban-type settlements under the district's jurisdiction:
Pesochnoye (Песочное)
with 16 rural okrugs under the district's jurisdiction.
Tutayevsky
Urban-type settlements under the district's jurisdiction:
Konstantinovsky (Константиновский)
with 10 rural okrugs under the district's jurisdiction.
Uglichsky
with 17 rural okrugs under the district's jurisdiction.
Yaroslavsky
Urban-type settlements under the district's jurisdiction:
Krasnye Tkachi (Красные Ткачи)
Lesnaya Polyana (Лесная Поляна)
with 19 rural okrugs under the district's jurisdiction.

References

Yaroslavl Oblast
Yaroslavl Oblast